Alport is a hamlet in the White Peak area of Derbyshire, England.  It lies east of Youlgreave, at the confluence of the River Bradford and the River Lathkill. The oldest house in the hamlet is Monks Hall. There also used to be a pub, which was demolished thanks the construction of a main road, which leads to the A6 and towards Buxton.

A Grade-II listed stone bridge crosses the River near the centre of the hamlet, close to the 18th century mill.

There are lead mines in the area, and at the Alport mine, an early steam-powered Nutating disc engine was installed.

In chronostratigraphy, the British sub-stage of the Carboniferous period, the 'Alportian' derives its name from study of a core from a borehole drilled at Alport.

The name Alport means "Old town", possibly with market trading connotations. The hamlet lies on the line of the Derbyshire Portway, an ancient trading route.

Governance
Alport is within the civil parish of Youlgreave which, in turn, is part of the Derbyshire Dales district.

External links
 Derbyshiredale District Nomination

See also
Derbyshire lead mining history
Alport Height near Wirksworth, Derbyshire
Alport Castles in the High Peak Estate
Listed buildings in Harthill, Derbyshire
Listed buildings in Youlgreave

References

Hamlets in Derbyshire
Towns and villages of the Peak District
Derbyshire Dales